Gunk may refer to:
 Gunge, or gunk, an unspecific greasy, filthy substance
 Gunk (mereology), the term in mereology for any whole whose parts all have further proper parts
 Gunk, a Belgian television program and monthly magazine
 Gunk, a line of automotive maintenance products produced by the Radiator Specialty Company
 Shawangunk Ridge, often referred to as "the Gunks"
 Gunk, a character in the comic strip Curtis

See also
 Gunkholing, a boating term referring to a type of cruising in shallow or shoal water
 The Gunk, a 2021 video game